Cheves is a surname. Notable people with the surname include:

Buck Cheves (1898–1995), American college football player and referee
Joe Cheves (1918–2007), American professional golfer 
Langdon Cheves (1776–1857), American politician, lawyer and businessman
Monnie T. Cheves (1902–1988), American professor and politician
Patrick Cheves (1820–1883), American politician